27th Guards Vitebsk Red Banner Rocket Army is one of the 3 rocket armies within Russian Strategic Rocket Forces headquartered at Vladimir, Vladimir Oblast in Western Russia.

In August 1959, based on the headquarters of the disbanded 10th Breakthrough Artillery Division 'Gumbinnen Orders of Suvorov and Kutuzov' of the Reserve of the Supreme High Command (Russian acronym RVGK), the formation of an organizational group 46th Training Artillery Range (Military Unit No. 43176) temporarily located in Mozyr, Gomel Oblast, Byelorussian Soviet Socialist Republic, was begun. It was subsequently relocated to the city of Krasnoyarsk.

In June 1960, in accordance with a directive of the General Staff dated 5 May 1960, an organizing group of the 46 Training Artillery Range relocated to the city of Vladimir, on the territory of the 7th Red Banner Vitebsk Guards Cannon Artillery Division of the RVGK. RVGK pad was turned on staffing organizational group of 46 Training Artillery Range, the rest of the staff – on staffing three rocket engineering brigades: the 165th (Kostroma), 197th (Vladimir Teykovo), 198th (Kozelsk, became 28th Guards Rocket Division). At the same time began the study of new missile technology.

On 10 March 1961 based on the 46th ALM HQ 3rd Separate Vitebsk Rocket Corps was formed. Appointed corps commander of the Guards, Major General AD Melekhin.

The 27th Army was formed in April 1970 on the base of the 3rd Separate Guards Vitebsk Rocket Corps and the 5th Separate Rocket Corps. The 27th Army is equipped with UR-100, RT-2PM Topol and RT-2UTTH Topol M intercontinental ballistic missiles.

Commanders 
 1970–1976: Lieutenant General (since 27 April 1975 Colonel General) of the Guards Vladimir Mikhailovich Vishenkov
 1976–1985: Lieutenant General (since 16 December 1982 Colonel General) of the Guards Vladimir Petrovich Shilovsky
 1985–1988: Lieutenant General of the Guards Gennadi Alekseyevich Kolesnikov
 1989–1994: Lieutenant General of the Guards Ivan Vasilyevich Vershkov
 1994–1996: Colonel General of the Guards Vladimir Nikolayevich Yakovlev
 1997–2001: Lieutenant General of the Guards Yuri Fyodorovich Kirillov
 2001–2002: Lieutenant General of the Guards Viktor Petrovich Alekseev
 2002–2006: Lieutenant General of the Guards Vladimir Grigoryevich Gagarin
 2006–2008: Lieutenant General of the Guards Sergei Viktorovich Karakayev
 2008–2010: Major General of the Guards Vladimir Vasilyevich Antsiferov
 2010–2016: Major General (since June 2013 Lieutenant General) of the Guards Sergey Viktorovich Siver
 2016–2019: Major General (since Decembre 2018 Lieutenant General) of the Guards Igor Robertovich Fazletdinov
 2019–2021: Lieutenant General of the Guards Andrei Anatolyevich Burdin
 since 2021: Major General of the Guards Oleg Leonidovich Glazunov

Composition 
In 1993, the army consisted of the:
7th Guards Rocket Division (Vypolzovo, Tver Oblast)
8th Rocket Division (Yurya, Kirov Oblast) – Activated 20.7.60 in Yurya, Kirov Oblast, as the 25th Missile Brigade, from parts of the 24th Artillery Range Administration. Awards and honours from the 91st Motor Rifle Division.
10th Guards Rocket Division (Kostroma, Kostroma Oblast)
28th Guards Rocket Division (Kozelsk, Kaluga Oblast)
32nd Rocket Division (Postavy, Vitebsk Oblast; disbanded 1.12.93)
33rd Guards Rocket Division (Mozyr, Gomel Oblast)
49th Guards Rocket Division (Lida, Grodno Region)
54th Guards Rocket Division (Teykovo, Ivanovo Oblast)
60th Rocket Division (Tatischevo, Saratov Oblast).

The 33rd and 49th Rocket Divisions were disbanded in 1997, and the 10th Guards Rocket Division in 2005.

Organisation 2006:
7th Guards Rocket Division (Vypolzovo, Tver Oblast)
8th Rocket Division (Yurya, Kirov Oblast)
14th Rocket Division (Yoshkar-Ola, Mari-El Republic)
28th Guards Rocket Division (Kozelsk, Kaluga Oblast)
54th Guards Rocket Division (Teykovo, Ivanovo Oblast)
60th Missile Division (Tatischevo, Saratov Oblast)
98th independent Mixed Aviation Squadron
65th Communications Center

There are 5 rocket divisions that are currently under command of the 27th Army:
 7th Guards Rocket Division (Military Unit Number 14245) (Closed city (ZATO) Ozyorny, Tver Oblast)
 14th Kiev-Zhitomir Rocket Division (Yoshkar-Ola, Mari El Republic) – resubordinated to 27th Army July 2002. Equipped with RT-2PM Topol (SS-25) ICBMs.
 28th Guards Red Banner Rocket Division
 54th Guards Order of Kutuzov second degree Rocket Division
 60th Taman Order of October Revolution Red Banner Rocket Division (Tatishchevsky District)(:ru:60-я Таманская ракетная дивизия)

References

Military units and formations of the Strategic Rocket Forces
Armies (military formations) of the Soviet Union
Armies of the Russian Federation
Military units and formations established in 1970